The Tyne and Wear Metrocars are a fleet of light rail vehicles manufactured by Metro-Cammell for the Tyne and Wear Metro in North East England between 1978 and 1981. For operation on Network Rail controlled tracks between Pelaw Junction and Sunderland, they are designated on TOPS as the Class 599. Most were refurbished between 2010 and 2015 by Wabtec Rail at Doncaster Works and are scheduled to be replaced by Class 555 rolling stock from 2023.

Design
The design of the Metrocars was partly derived from that of the German Stadtbahnwagen B. However, they were built by Metro-Cammell in Birmingham, and were not fitted with the lights and indicators that would have allowed them to run on streets.

Each Metrocar consists of two semi-permanently connected coaches mounted on three bogies, with the middle bogie being a Jacobs Bogie. The outermost bogies are powered and the centre Jacobs Bogie, located in the articulated section between both halves is unpowered. Metrocars have three acceleration steps, and four braking steps, and an additional emergency brake step which drops the emergency magnetic track brakes.

Many features of the Metrocar are operated by compressed air which is stored in a reservoir under the driving cab at the front of the train. Features operated by air include: air-operated disk brakes, horn, windscreen wipers and passenger doors, as well as being used to raise the pantograph. As the section between Pelaw and Sunderland on which they operate is part of the Network Rail system, the units were allocated TOPS class 599 in January 2002.

Prototypes and test track
Prior to opening, two prototypes, 4001 and 4002, underwent several years of testing from June 1975 on a  test track in Backworth. The track was built on the route of an old mineral wagonway formerly part of the North Tyneside Steam Railway. It had a two-lane car shed and a mock station platform, along with a short tunnel section which consisted of concrete tunnel segments laid at ground level; the tunnel was later demolished to allow testing of prototype cars for the Hong Kong MTR, also built by Metro-Cammell, these cars having a very large profile. The test track was closed in 1980, and it is now home to the Stephenson Railway Museum.

The prototype cars are very similar to the production fleet, with the exception of having Kiekert passenger doors, which were refitted to match the specification of the production fleet before entering passenger service. The prototype cars were also fitted with two different types of block coupling equipment (one at each end), allowing the two designs to be thoroughly tested. The prototypes featured small cabs and central end doors similar to London Underground stock, to allow evacuation of trains in a tunnel. In the event, the Metro tunnels were constructed with continuous sidewalks, making the end doors unnecessary. Prior to their entry into service in 1987, the two prototypes were refitted to reflect the specification of the production fleet. The small cabs remained in the series vehicles with a passenger seat beside offering a forward view.

Livery
The Metro fleet was initially painted in a two-tone livery of cadmium yellow and white that matched the Metro station design and the livery of the Tyne and Wear bus fleet until 1986. In 1995, a new colour scheme was introduced - solid red, green or blue with a yellow wedge at each end and yellow triangles on the doors. This scheme was modified slightly in 2005, in part to comply with safety regulations - the doors were changed to solid yellow to comply with the Disability Discrimination Act 1995. In addition to the standard colour scheme, a large number of special liveries were carried. These were often advertisements for local businesses such as Metrocar 4042 advertising the Evening Chronicle. To celebrate the Golden Jubilee of Elizabeth II in 2002, unit 4032 was temporarily decorated in a special gold livery. It was then returned to the red and yellow livery, which it carried until refurbishment.

Between 2012 and 2015, 86 Metrocars were refurbished and repainted in a black and yellow livery. The refurbishment reduced the number of liveries in use. Metrocars 4033 and 4082 carried a promotional livery for Emirates, although they have since been repainted to match the other units. Unrefurbished Metrocar 4083 continued to carry an Emirates livery. Until 2017, prototype unit 4001 carried its original cadmium-and-white livery whilst 4002 carried an advertisement for the Tyne and Wear Metro website. Both were repainted in 2017 into the same black and yellow livery carried by the refurbished Metrocars, but in September 2019, Metrocar 4001 underwent further repainting into a 40 Years livery with all four previous liveries amalgamated into one. In August 2019, Metrocar 4040 was repainted into the black and yellow livery, and 4083 followed shortly after in May 2020. As a consequence of this, the only liveries that currently exist are the standard black and yellow, and the 40 Years celebration livery on 4001.

Electrics
The network is electrified with a  overhead line system. This voltage was previously used on and number of United Kingdom lines, including the Woodhead line, but is now unique. Each Metrocar has its own Brecknell Willis pantograph for collecting power from the overhead line.

Formation
During the early years of Metro, units were operated in single and double sets. As single units became overcrowded, Nexus resumed using two units as standard. Single units again became common during construction of the Sunderland extension when some units were taken for testing of the new track. During original construction, the Metro system was designed to use three unit sets, and some platforms were constructed to accommodate this; however, due to a lack of funding, this was not possible. As a result, the units run in sets of two.

Announcements

The "stand clear of the doors please" announcement, which sounded before the doors started to close, was introduced in 1991. In order to increase the clarity of the announcement (especially for individuals not fluent in English) the phrase was replaced with "doors closing" in 2004.

In 2011, the "doors closing" recording was replaced in post-refurbishment Metrocars with a simple beeping sound, similar to that of the London Underground. The train emits a solid 3-second beep when the doors are released, and a rapid 3-second beeping immediately before the doors are closed, in line with the 2010 UK Rail Vehicle Accessibility Regulations (RVAR).

When the automated next station announcements were introduced they featured a female announcer, however during late 2014 this was replaced with a male announcer. The female announcements are still in use by two Metrocars, however can only be heard when the Metrocar is at the front of the train.

Refurbishment
All 90 units underwent a half life refurbishment between 1996 and 2000. In June 2010, Wabtec Rail was awarded a contract to perform a three-quarter life refurbishment at Doncaster Works, which included making them compliant with the Disability Discrimination Act 1995. The first was completed in February 2012, with the last in July 2015. Cost overruns and technical issues resulted in only 86 being completed, with 4001, 4002, 4040 and 4083 remaining in service in un-refurbished condition. Because they did not comply with the Disability Discrimination Act 1995, they were restricted to operating peak hour services. 

The refurbishment saw the trains undergo corrosion correction work, to repair damage as a result of the trains' steel and aluminium construction, new seating, flooring and interior finish, in addition to improved saloon and emergency lighting. A new larger wheelchair space has also been created at the end of each car, featuring a "call for assistance" device. Other minor modifications include improved door seals, more concise interior signage and removal of the green boarding lamps to facilitate new audio warning equipment for door operation. Some Metrocars also featured air conditioning boxes at their A end to control the conditions within the drivers cab, these were later removed from the units due to overhead line (OHLE) clearance issues if trains were to be placed on wheelskates. Passenger counters were integrated above doors to help Nexus analyse trends in passenger levels. These features were removed from the specification midway through the refurbishment however. 

After an accident at Gosforth in March 2017, 4022 was taken to Bristol Barton Hill TMD for assessment, before moving to the Nemesis Rail facility at Burton upon Trent in October 2019 for scrapping. In early 2020, units 4001, 4002, 4040 and 4083 had a luggage bay in the middle of the carriage converted to a disabled bay, making it in a different area than the refurbished units but now complying with the Disability Discrimination Act 1995. These units are still most commonly sighted on peak services but can also be seen across the network again usually as back up trains but give the Metro more flexibility with the common breakdowns of its ageing 40-year old fleet of trains.

Replacement
In January 2020. Stadler Rail was awarded a contract to build 42 (later increased to 46) five-carriage Class 555 articulated light rail trains to replace the Metrocars, with deliveries scheduled to commence in late 2022.

Preservation 
In March 2023, it was anounced that 4001 would be preserved at the Stephenson Railway Museum in North Shields, on the site of the original Metro test track.

References

External links

Electric multiple units of Great Britain
Train-related introductions in 1980
Tram vehicles of the United Kingdom
Tyne and Wear Metro
1500 V DC multiple units
Metropolitan Cammell multiple units